Metropolitan Ioann (secular name Vasyl Mykolayovych Bodnarchuk, ; 12 April 1927 – 9 November 1994) was an Orthodox hierarch born in the Ternopil area of Western Ukraine, which at that time was a territory of Poland. Defrocked from the Russian Orthodox Church, metropolitan Ioann played a notable role in revival of the Ukrainian Autocephalous Orthodox Church.

During his life he served as a bishop successively in the Russian Orthodox Church (1977–1989), in the Ukrainian Autocephalous Orthodox Church (1989–1992) and in the Ukrainian Orthodox Church of the Kyivan Patriarchate (1992–1994).

Biography
Though he was born into a family of Ukrainian Catholics, he converted to Orthodoxy early in his childhood. His name at birth was Vasyl Bondarchuk (Wasyl Bodnarczuk).

Arrest
Following World War II since 1945, Vasyl Bondarchuk served as a cantor (dyak) leading a church choir in home village Ivane-Puste.

In 1946, the Soviet authorities liquidated the Ukrainian Greek Catholic Church which was widespread in Western Ukraine, while many members of the church were persecuted in various ways. In 1949, Ioan (Bodnarchuk) was arrested for his relations with Organization of Ukrainian Nationalists and sentenced to 20 years of hard labor spending time in Tyumen labor camp and later in the Kengir copper mines near Karaganda (Steplag). His family also was deported to Kazakhstan, where they lived until 1954 and in 1953 or in 1955 he was released on amnesty.

Education
 
In 1957, he was accepted into the Leningrad Theological Seminary and on 25 January 1958, he received holy orders to become a deacon. After graduating from the seminary, he was accepted into the Leningrad Theological Academy and on 21 May 1961, he received holy orders became a priest with the ceremony being led by Metropolitan of Leningrad and Ladoga Pimen. Note, both seminary and academy are located in one place, Alexander Nevsky Lavra.

In 1964, he graduated the Academy with a PhD in Divinity and he was sent to the Lviv and Ternopil diocese of the Moscow Patriarchate. He served as a priest in the village of Striivka in Zbarazh Raion which is in the Ternopil Oblast and in 1968, he served as a priest in a parish in the Lviv Oblast (Truskavets).

Clergy experience

On 11 October 1977, he took his monastic vows in Pochaiv Lavra and on 14 October 1977 was awarded the title of Archimandrite. On 23 October 1977, he was consecrated as a bishop of Zhytomyr and Ovruch (Russian Orthodox Church), the cheirotonia service was led by metropolitans Filaret (Denysenko) and Mykola (Yuryk).

In the beginning of 1989 there was created the Initiative Committee on revival of the Ukrainian Autocephalous Orthodox Church (UAOC) led by a priest Bohdan Mykhailechko, provost of Assumption of the Blessed Virgin Mary Church in Jelgava, Latvian SSR. The committee petitioned to presidiums of supreme councils of the Soviet Union and the Ukrainian SSR to legalise and register Ukrainian Autocephalous Orthodox Church. The committee members also were asking Ecumenical Patriarch Demetrios I of Constantinople, Ukrainian Autocephalous Orthodox Church in diaspora and other autocephalous churches to show support for Ukrainians to have own church. In June 1989 the UAOC Kyiv community petitioned to the Kyiv city authorities to have the Nicholas Embarkment Church at Kyiv Harbour transferred to them, but it was absolutely declined. On 19 August 1989 a group of clergy and laity led by protoiereus Dymytriy Yarema who was a provost of Peter and Paul Church in Lviv declared of leaving the Russian Orthodox Church. Less than a month later on 8 September 1989 Metropolitan Mstyslav of UAOC in the US and diaspora, a locum tenens of Kyiv Metropolia, announced that Bohdan Mykhailechko is his deputy and spiritual administrator with obligations to organize, coordinate, and carry out actions to revive the Holy Ukrainian Autocephalous Orthodox Church in Ukraine, while Dymytriy Yarema was appointed his assistant.

On 13 September 1989 Ioan (Bodnarchuk) was released from management of the diocese on the basis of health problems and granted a leave of absence on his personal request earlier in June 1989. Five days after his dismissal, bishop Ioan asked the Holy Synod to reinstate him in the Church as he recovered. On 3 October 1989 the Holy Synod requested from him supporting documentation to confirm his health conditions and on 9 October 1989 he submitted requested documents.

Earlier on 1 October 1989 Ioan (Bondarchuk) sent a telegram to the Holy Synod announcing that he is leaving Moscow Patriarchate and accepts a canonical rule of Metropolitan Mstyslav of UAOC in the USA and diaspora. On 2 October 1989 in Lviv took place the Ukrainian Autocephalous Orthodox Church eparchial assembly that appealed to Ioan (Bodnarchuk) to take charge in leading the Ukrainian Autocephalous Orthodox Church. On 16 October 1989 Ioan (Bodnarchuk) accepted the petition. On 22 October 1989 Ioan (Bodnarchuk) consecrated a deacon of Ukrainian Autocephalous Orthodox Church.

On 13 November 1989 Ioan (Bodnarchuk) was defrocked by the Holy Synod of the Russian Orthodox Church.

The Ukrainian Autocephalous Orthodox Church in Ukraine was faced with a problem in reinstating its bishop hierarchy. Ioan (Bodnarchuk) petition to Patriarch of Georgian Orthodox Church, vicar bishop Jonathan (Yeletskikh) of Pereyaslav, Metropolitan Vladimir (Cantarean) of Chisinau and all Moldova, and others.

According to Ioan (Bodnarchuk), he again was consecrated as bishop of Ternopil and Buchach on 31 March 1990 by bishop Varlaam (Ilyuschenko) of Simferopol and Crimea and bishop Vikentiy (Chekalin) of Yasna Poliana.

Then in 1992, he was excluded from the clergy of the Ukrainian Autocephalous Orthodox Church, where he repented and submitted an application on returning to the Moscow Patriarchate. But, before the decision was made on his behalf, Metropolitan Ioann changed his mind and recalled his petition.

Instead, he joined the Ukrainian Orthodox Church – Kyiv Patriarchate and was appointed as Metropolitan of Drohobych and Sambir. Later he would be appointed Metropolitan of Lutsk and Volyn.

Consecrated bishops
 Vasyliy (Bodnarchuk) – 31 March 1990 (along with archbishop of Simferopol and Crimea Varlaam, bishop of Yasnaya Poliana Vikentiy)
 Andriy (Abramchuk) – 7 April 1990 (along with bishop of Ternopil-Buchach Vasyliy, bishop of Yasna Poliana Vikentiy)
 Danyil (Kovalchuk) – 27 April 1990 (along with bishop of Ternopil-Buchach Vasyliy, bishop of Ivano-Frankivsk and Kolomyia Andriy)
 Volodymyr (Romaniuk) – 29 April 1990 (along with bishop of Ternopil-Buchach Vasyliy, bishop of Ivano-Frankivsk and Kolomyia Andriy, bishop of Chernivtsi and Bukovina Danyil)
 Mykolai (Hrokh) – 19 May 1990
 Roman (Balashchuk) – 22 May 1990 (along with bishop of Ternopil-Buchach Vasyliy, bishop of Ivano-Frankivsk and Kolomyia Andriy)
 Antoniy (Masendych) – 16 September 1990 (along with bishop Volodymyr, bishop of Chernivtsi and Bukovina Danyil)

In 1991 all consecrations were repeated with help of bishop of Washington Antoniy when credentials of bishop of Yasna Polina Vikentiy were questioned.

Death

He died in a car accident in 1994.

References

External links
Religious Information Service of Ukraine
Dmytro Shapovalov. УАПЦ: у пошуках моделі творення помісної Церкви. www.interklasa.pl. 28 February 2005

1929 births
1994 deaths
People from Ternopil Oblast
20th-century Eastern Orthodox bishops
First Hierarchs of the Ukrainian Autocephalous Orthodox Church
Ukrainian prisoners and detainees
Prisoners and detainees of the Soviet Union
People convicted in relations with the Organization of Ukrainian Nationalists
Steplag detainees
Bishops of the Russian Orthodox Church